Windsor Vineyards is a winery located in Windsor, California, United States.

Founded in 1959 in Tiburon, California by winemaker Rodney Strong, Windsor Vineyards has been referred to as a pioneer in the direct-to-consumer wine business, and remains one of the largest direct-to-consumer wineries in the United States.

History

Originally called Tiburon Vinters, in 1962 Strong relocated the winery to Windsor and renamed it to Windsor Vineyards. The move allowed for increased production and was closer to Strong's Sonoma County vineyard properties. The winery was eventually sold to the Klein winemaking family in 1989.

The winery changed hands again in 2000 when it was purchased by Australian wine unit Mildura Blass, who added Windsor to its family of international wine holdings under the umbrella of Beringer Blass Wine Estates.

Most recently, vintner Patrick Roney purchased Windsor Vineyards in 2007, who subsequently brought in winemaker Marco DiGiulio, and moved the tasting room to the Healdsburg town square, a central location to the winery's primary AVA sources (Dry Creek Valley AVA, Alexander Valley AVA, and The Russian River Valley AVA).

Notes and references

External links
 Windsor Vineyards website

Wineries in Sonoma County
Windsor, California
American companies established in 1959
Food and drink companies established in 1959
1959 establishments in California